The Prodigal is the debut album of Nigerian singer  Mr. P as a solo artist. It was released on April 2 2021.

Background

The 16-track album has a running time of 61 minutes and features Mohombi on "Just Like That",  Wande Coal on "Follow My Lead", Tiwa Savage on "I Do", Singah on "Paloma" and "Lola Diego", Simi, Teni and Tamar Braxton on "I Love You", Ovie Kelz on "Grow Old" and DJ Switch on "Prodigal".

The producers includes Mr. P (tracks 1 & 5), Goldswarn (tracks 6,8,9,11,12,15), Shugavibes (tracks 2,3,4 & 7), Sarmy Fire (tracks 12 and 16), DaiHardBeats (track 13) and Kealzbeats (track 14)

Singles

"Follow my lead" featuring Wande Coal was released as a single on December 11, 2020. When announcing the single, Mr. P said “Through my journey in life and as an artist, every battle I've won; big and small has been because I followed my instincts. When you know exactly who you are and what you're capable of, you learn to trust yourself. And that has made it easy for me to follow my lead."

Reception

The album was rated 6.0/10 by Motolani Alake of Pulse Nigeria.

Olalekan Okeremilekun of tooXclusive says "Mr. P has a lot to be thankful for because unlike what a lot of critics expected, Mr. P did a fine job. The 60-minute album is packed with good songs and collaborations." He also added that "the production is quite impressive, as well as the chemistry between the featured artiste and Mr. P."

Afrobeatsvibe rated the album 3.5/5 adding that "If anyone doubted Peter Okoye’s ability as a solo artist, this album surely puts all those arguments to rest."

Track listing

References

Albums by Nigerian artists
Afro pop music albums
2021 debut albums